Reuvein Margolies, (Hebrew: ראובן מרגליות) (November 30, 1889 – August 28, 1971) was an Israeli author, Talmudic scholar and head of the Rambam library.

Early life 
Margolies was born in 1889 in Lemberg (now Lviv), then part of the Austrian-Hungarian Empire and now in Ukraine and from 1918 to 1940 in Poland. After the passing of his wife, he emigrated to Israel in 1934, settling in Tel Aviv.

Writings 
Margolies authored over 55 books on Jewish topics. He possessed a photographic memory, and was well versed in all aspects of both the written Bible, Oral Torah (Talmud and its commentaries) and Kabbalah (Zohar etc.). He established the Rambam library.

He wrote on a wide range of subjects; His works were meant for both scholars and laymen alike. All of his writings are in Hebrew.

He wrote on the formation of the Mishna and the Talmud displaying originality in thought, and a wide range of knowledge.

He further wrote on the Kabbalah. Such works include "The Rambam and the Zohar" demonstrating correlations between Maimonides Mishneh Torah and the Zohar; Nitzotzei Zohar demonstrating correlations between the Tannatic and Amoraic works (such as the Talmud and Medrashim) and the Zohar.

He was also involved in a controversy with Gershon Scholem over the Rabbi Jacob Emden/Rabbi Jonathan Eybeshuetz controversy. Margulies produced a pamphlet defending R. Eybeshuetz and in response Scholem produced his own disagreeing with Marguleis's conclusions.

He wrote a number of scholarly biographies of major Jewish personalities such as Maharsha, Ohr Ha-Chaim Hakodosh, Noam Elimelech, Rabbi Moses ben Nachman (Ramban), and R' Yechiel of Paris including valuable annotation clarifying ideas in their works. The biographies focus primarily on their methods of scholarship and not on their personalities. First printed in Poland, they were never reprinted.

He wrote several works concerning the development of a legal system in the newly formed Jewish State (Kavei Ohr, Tal Techiyah).

According to Dr. Yitzchok Raphael, his writing is in a terse style designed to concentrate a maximum amount of information in a minimum of space.

Awards 
 In 1957, Margolies was awarded the Israel Prize for his work on Rabbinical literature.

Bibliography 

 Toldot Adam (Lemberg 1912) on R. Shmuel Edels, also known by the acronym "Maharsha"
 Kav Bashamaim (Lemberg 1913), notes on the writings of the Tosafists
 Kavei Ohr and Tal Techiya (Lemberg 1921), two volumes on Jewish law in the Land of Israel, and essays on various topics, including "Medicine and Healers in the Talmud", "The Laws of Ger Toshav", and the first printing of "Yesod Hamishna Va'arichatah"
 Yesod Hamishna Va'arichatah (Lemberg, printed on its own first in 1923, then 1933, with addendums in Jerusalem 1956) on the creation of the Mishna
 Sefer Hasidim (Lemberg 1924, Jerusalem 1957, 1960, 1964, 1970) by Rabbi Yehuda Hachassid, with biographical information, commentaries, and his own notes titled Mekor Hessed
 Tolodot Rabbenu Hayyim ben Atar (Lemberg, 1925), biography on the Ohr ha-Hayyim includes the notes of Rabbi Meir Dan Plotzky (Kli Chemdah)
 Ohr Meir (Lemberg 1926, Tel Aviv 1964), biography of R. Meir of Przemyślany
 Margenita d'Reb Meir (Lemberg 1926, Germany 1948, Tel Aviv 1964), sayings of the above R. Meir
 She'elot Uteshuvot Min Hashamayim (Lemberg 1926, 1929, Jerusalem 1957), the responsa of R' Yaakov the Tosafist, who claimed to have received answers to questions of Jewish law from an angel, with R. Margolios's extensive notes, as well as a comprehensive introduction discussing prophecy and its effect on Jewish law and other related topics
 Yalkut Margoliot (Lemberg 1927), homiletic material for Sabbaths and holidays, and various times of the year
 Imrei Kadosh Hashalem (Lemberg 1928)
 Vikuach Rabbenu Yehiel miParis (Lemberg, 1928), the disputation of Rabbi Yehiel of Paris in 1240, with biography of R. Yehiel
 Mekor Hesed (Lemberg 1928)
 Lecheker Shemot Vekinuyim Batalmud (Lemberg 1928, Jerusalem 1960), on names and nicknames in the Talmud
 Hilula D'Tzidkaya (Lemberg 1929, Tel Aviv 1930, 1961), a collection of different views and customs of great Torah scholars
 Vikuach HaRamban (Bilgoraj 1928), the disputation of Nachmanides against Pablo Christiani in 1263, with his notes
 Butzina D'Nehora Hashalem (Bilgoraj 1930)
 Gevurat Ari (Lemberg 1930)
 Toldot Rabbenu Avrohom Maimoni (Lemberg 1930), biography of the son of Maimonides, Rabbi Abraham ben HaRambam, including his responsa translated from the original Arabic
 Mekor Baruch (Lemberg 1931)
 Shem Olam (Lemberg 1931, 1962), an attempt to discover the authorities behind the Talmudic phrase "One said... and one said..." in Midrash, Babylonian Talmud, and Jerusalem Talmud
 Nefesh Haya (Lemberg 1932, Tel Aviv 1954), notes on Shulchan Orakh Orakh Haim
 Hagadah shel Pesach (Tel Aviv 1937, 1950), with commentary
 Sichot Chachamim (Tel Aviv 1938), a collection of sayings and quotes from various rabbinic sages
 Ner LaMaor (Bilgoraj 1932, Jerusalem 1959), notes and emendations on the book Ohr HaHaim by Rabbi Haim ben Atar
 Mekor Habracha (Lember 1934), on clarifying the concept of making a blessing for a Torah commandment "al asiyatan", as well as the formulation of the blessings
 Zohar (Jerusalem 1940–1946, 1960) with his extensive notes (multiple printings)
 Sibat Hitnagduto (Tel Aviv 1941), discussing the R. Emden/R. Eybeschitz controversy
 Mal'ache Elyon (Jerusalem 1945, 1964) on angels in the thought of Hazal
 Olelot (Jerusalem 1947), essays on various topics
 Tekunei Zohar (Tel Aviv 1948), a kabbalistic work attributed to Rabbi Shimon Bar Yohai, with extensive notes by Rabbi Margolies
 Sefer HaBahir (Jerusalem 1951), a kabbalistic work attributed to Rabbi Nehunye Ben HaKaneh with extensive notes by Rabbi Margolies
 Zohar Hadash (Jerusalem 1953), a collection of statements from the Zohar, arranged according to the weekly portion. Includes a discussion of the tradition of the Zohar, as well as comparisons of sayings from the Talmud and Midrash, with the Zohar
 Milchamot Hashem (Jerusalem 1953), the famous book by Rabbi Abraham ben HaRambam about the controversy surrounding his father, Maimonides. This version is based on the manuscript from the Vatican. The introduction is a biography of Rabbi Abraham ben HaRambam by Rabbi Morgolies
 Mefarshei HaTalmud (Jerusalem 1954–1961), a commentary on some parts of the Talmud
 Shaarei Zohar (Jerusalem 1957) notes on the Talmud directing one to the relevant passages in Zohar.
 Margalios HaYam (Jerusalem 1958), a commentary on Sanhedrin
 D'varim B'Itam (Tel Aviv 1959), homiletic material for Sabbaths and holidays and various times of the year
 HaMikra Vehamesora (Jerusalem 1964, 1965), various articles relating to issues of chain of tradition in Judaism, as well as other various topics
 Mechkarim Bedarkei Hatalmud Vechidotav (Jerusalem 1967), varied essays on the Talmud
 Peninim U'Margoliyot A posthumously published collection of essays.

There is also a memorial volume edited by Dr. Yitchak Raphael and published by Mossad R' Kook, which describes these and more books in more detail.

See also 
 List of Israel Prize recipients
 Margolies

References

External links 
 Several of his works are available on Hebrew Books
 Bibliography
 Photo

Israel Prize in Rabbinical literature recipients
Israel Prize Rabbi recipients
Israeli librarians
Orthodox rabbis in Mandatory Palestine
Religious Zionist Orthodox rabbis
Rabbis from Lviv
Polish emigrants to Mandatory Palestine
Burials at Nahalat Yitzhak Cemetery
1889 births
1971 deaths